The following is a list of the 586 communes of the French department of Haute-Garonne.

The communes cooperate in the following intercommunalities (as of 2020):
Toulouse Métropole
CA Le Muretain Agglo
Communauté d'agglomération du Sicoval
Communauté de communes du Bassin Auterivain Haut-Garonnais
Communauté de communes Cagire Garonne Salat
Communauté de communes Cœur de Garonne
Communauté de communes Cœur et Coteaux du Comminges
Communauté de communes des Coteaux Bellevue
Communauté de communes des Coteaux du Girou
Communauté de communes du Frontonnais
Communauté de communes de la Gascogne Toulousaine (partly)
Communauté de communes des Hauts Tolosans
Communauté de communes Lauragais Revel Sorezois (partly)
Communauté de communes des Pyrénées Haut-Garonnaises
Communauté de communes de la Save au Touch
Communauté de communes Tarn-Agout (partly)
Communauté de communes des Terres du Lauragais
Communauté de communes Val'Aïgo
Communauté de communes du Volvestre

References

Haute-Garonne